Morinoideae is a subfamily of plants in the family Caprifoliaceae, order Dipsacales. It was at one time recognized as the separate family Morinaceae. The genus Morina has also been included in a separate family Dipsacaceae, currently included in Caprifoliaceae.  Three genera have been included in this subfamily:

 Acanthocalyx 
 A. alba, A. albus, A. delavayi, A. nepalensis.

 Cryptothladia 
 C. chinensis, C. chlorantha, C. kokonorica, C. polyphylla

 Morina 
 M. couteriana, M. longifolia, M. persica 
 M. longifolia has the common names "whorl flower" and "Persian steppe flower." This species has cultivars: M. delavaya and M. wallichii.

References

Cannon MJ, Cannon JFM. 1984. A revision of the Morinaceae (Magnoliophyta-Dipsacales). vol. 12. Bull. Br. Mus. (Nat. Hist.) Bot., 35p. 
Bell, C. D. & M. J. Donoghue. 2003. Phylogeny of Morinaceae (Dipsacales) based on nuclear and chloroplast DNA sequences. Organisms, Diversity, & Evolution 3:227-237.

Dipsacales